Gator Tales was a local children's television show produced in St. Louis, Missouri by local CBS affiliate KMOV. The show aired on Saturdays and Sundays in key states throughout the Midwest from 1988 to 1999, including Missouri, Arkansas, and Illinois.

The 30-minute show- which stressed the development of good character values and self-esteem- featured a quirky puppet alligator named "Grouchie Gator" and his puppet friends (performed by puppeteer Doug Kincaid and "The Kincaid Karacter Puppets"), a visiting storyteller friend, and an occasional walk-on guest star. The storylines revolved around "Grouchie's Place" (Grouchie Gator's backwoods store, located in an imaginary swamp) and usually involved Grouchie getting into some sort of trouble through a never-ending variety of crazy schemes, only to be gently shown the error of his ways by his storyteller friends, via their recitation of an appealing folk tale (with a subtle moral lesson at the end), related to the situation at hand.

"Gator Tales" was produced by Al Frank (later Rebecca McDowell), and was directed by Skip Goodrum. Brothers Bill (William Kincaid) and Doug Kincaid- in addition to creating Grouchie Gator and all the other "Kincaid Karacter" puppet characters featured on "Gator Tales"- also designed the set and created the props for the show. In addition, Doug Kincaid wrote the scripts for all the episodes.  

From 1988-93 the part of the storyteller was played by Bobby Norfolk, and from 1994-99 the role was filled by Annette Harrison.  The show at times featured guest appearances by notable local actors, including four-time world-class martial arts champion & actor Earnest Hart, Jr., and American entertainment reporter, game show host, and author Todd Newton in one of his first professional TV roles.

"Gator Tales" won numerous regional Emmy Awards during its 11-year run on KMOV, and was one of the last of the "classic" local children's television shows to be produced, prior to the eventual dominance of syndicated broadcast programming, cable TV and the growth of such national children's television giants as Nickelodeon.

Doug Kincaid starred on "D. B.'s Delight", another children's show, prior to his work on "Gator Tales".

References

St. Louis Post Dispatch, Monday March 20, 1989, "Kids Learning Responsibility With "Gator" Aid", article on "Gator Tales" television show and Bill & Doug Kincaid

St. Louis Sun TV Magazine, Oct. 28, 1989, "Gator Aid", article on "Gator Tales" and Bill & Doug Kincaid

Inc._(magazine), September 10, 2018, "Meet the Company Behind Thousands of America's Favorite Mascots"- article on William Kincaid, Doug Kincaid, and The Kincaid Karacter Company

External links 
 Official Website of The Kincaid Karacter Puppets

1988 American television series debuts
1999 American television series endings
American television shows featuring puppetry
Local children's television programming in the United States
1980s American children's television series
1990s American children's television series
Fictional crocodilians
Mass media in St. Louis
Television in St. Louis